Olentangy Glacier is a glacier draining that portion of the Wisconsin Plateau of the Horlick Mountains that stands east-northeast of Sisco Mesa, flowing south to merge into McCarthy Glacier and the larger Reedy Glacier to the southwest of Mount McNaughton. The glacier was mapped by United States Geological Survey (USGS) and from U.S. Navy air photos in 1960–64. The name was proposed by the Ohio State University geological party to the Horlick Mountains, 1964–65. The Olentangy River flows through the university campus.

Glaciers of Marie Byrd Land